Kathleen Mary Spagnolo (September 12, 1919 – February 15, 2016) was an American artist based in Alexandria, Virginia.  

Upon graduation as a Royal Scholar at the Royal College of Art in London., she worked as an artist for the Royal Air Force during World War II. There she met her American husband and emigrated to America. Spagnolo worked as a commercial illustrator in Alexandria before studying printmaking at American University under Robert Franklin Gates and Krishna Reddy.

Her work is included in the collections of the Smithsonian American Art Museum, the University of Arizona Museum of Art 
the Georgetown University Art Museum. 

Spagnolo was an original homeowner of the Hollin Hills Historic District, a nationally recognized mid-century modern community in northern Virginia. For more than 30 years, she was active in the community and helped produce the Hollin Hills Bulletin newsletter. She died in 2016 and is buried at the Culpeper National Cemetery with her late husband and Army veteran Frank Spagnolo (1913–1972).

References

1919 births
2016 deaths
20th-century American women artists
21st-century American women artists
Alumni_of_the_Royal_College_of_Art
Artists from London
Artists from Virginia
Artists in the Smithsonian American Art Museum collection
British emigrants to the United States
People from Fairfax County, Virginia